Rollo and the Brush Bros. is a clone of Konami's arcade game Amidar published by Windmill software in 1984 as a copy-protected, self-booting disk for the IBM PC. The player controls "Rollo" while attempting paint the entire maze and avoiding the "Brush Brothers."

External links
 http://www.mobygames.com/game/pc-booter/rollo-and-the-brush-brothers

1984 video games
Maze games
Video games developed in Canada
Video game clones
Windmill Software games